The 2015–16 season is FK Vojvodina's 11th season in the Serbian SuperLiga, the top-flight of Serbian football.

Transfers

Summer

In:

Out:

Winter

In:

Out:

Squad 
As of 1 March 2016

Players with multiple nationalities
   John Mary
   Marko Kordić
   Milko Novaković
   Bojan Nastić

Competitions

Serbian SuperLiga

League table

Serbian Cup

UEFA Europa League

Qualifying rounds

Notes

References

FK Vojvodina seasons
Vojvodina
Vojvodina